Balçılı (also, Balchyly) is a village and municipality in the Yevlakh Rayon of Azerbaijan.  It has a population of 1,104.  The municipality consists of the villages of Balçılı and Ağqıraq.

References 

Populated places in Yevlakh District